The FIBA Asia Stanković Cup 2004 served as the qualifying tournament for the 2005 FIBA Asia Championship. This competition is distinct from the Stanković Cup intercontinental tournament attended by teams outside the FIBA Asia zone.

Qualification
According to the FIBA Asia rules, each zone had one place, and the hosts team (Chinese Taipei) and Asian champion (China) were automatically qualified. The other three places are allocated to the zones according to performance in the 2003 ABC Championship.

* Withdrew

Draw

* Withdrew

Preliminary round

Group A

Group B

Classification 5th–8th

Semifinals

7th place

5th place

Final round

Semifinals

3rd place

Final

Final standing

Awards

See also
 List of sporting events in Taiwan

References

External links
JABBA Official website

Stankovic Cup, 2004
Fiba Asia Stankovic Cup, 2004
B
FIBA Asia Challenge
Sports competitions in Taipei
November 2004 sports events in Asia